Sextus Aurelius Victor (c. 320 – c. 390) was a historian and politician of the Roman Empire. Victor was the author of a short history of imperial Rome, entitled De Caesaribus and covering the period from Augustus to Constantius II. The work was published in 361. Under the emperor Julian (361-363), Victor served as governor of Pannonia Secunda; in 389 he became praefectus urbi (urban prefect), senior imperial official in Rome.

Works 
Four small historical works have been ascribed to him, although only his authorship of De Caesaribus is securely established:
Origo Gentis Romanae
De Viris Illustribus Romae
De Caesaribus (for which Aurelius Victor used the Enmannsche Kaisergeschichte)
Epitome de Caesaribus (attributed)
The four have generally been published together under the name Historia Romana. The second was first printed at Naples about 1472, in 4to, under the name of Pliny the Younger, and the fourth in Strasbourg in 1505. 

The first edition of all four books was that of Andreas Schott (8 volumes, Antwerp, 1579). A recent edition of the De Caesaribus is by Pierre Dufraigne (Collection Budé, 1975).

See also
Sirmium
Sremska Mitrovica
Syrmia
Tetrarchy
Praetorian prefecture
Praetorian prefecture of Illyricum
Roman provinces
Roman Empire

Notes

References

H.W. Bird (1994) Aurelius Victor: De Caesaribus. Liverpool: Liverpool University Press.
H.W. Bird (1984) Sextus Aurelius Victor: A Historiographical Study. Liverpool: Francis Cairns.
W. den Boer (1972) Some Minor Roman Historians. Leiden: Brill.
P. Dufraigne (1975) Aurelius Victor: Livre de Cesars. Paris: Les Belles Lettres.
D. Rohrbacher (2002) The Historians of Late Antiquity. London: Routledge.

External links
 
Works by Aurelius Victor in thelatinlibrary.com (Latin text)
Works by Aurelius Victor in forumromanum.org (Latin, English and French texts)
Sexti Aurelii Victoris quae vulgo habentur scripta historica, Friedrich Schroeter (ed.), 2 voll., Lipsiae, sumptibus Augusti Lehnholdi, 1829-31 (contains Origo and De viris illustribus).
Sexti Aurelii Victoris de caesaribus liber, Franciscus Pichlmayr (ed.), Monachii, typos curavit F. Straub, 1892.
Sexti Aurelii Victoris historia romana, Lipsiae, sumptibus succ. Ottonis Holtze, 1892 (contains the opera omnia).
Sexti Aurelii Victoris historia romana, Th. Chr. Harlesii (ed.), 2 voll., Londini, curante et imprimente A. J. Valpy, 1829: vol. 1, vol. 2 (contains the opera omnia).

4th-century births
4th-century deaths
4th-century historians
4th-century Romans
Ancient Roman governors
Ancient Roman politicians
Victor
Latin historians
Urban prefects of Rome
Year of birth uncertain
Year of death uncertain